This is the list of episodes for all the Japanese animation series . Based on the light novel series by Toshihiko Tsukiji, the animation series was produced by J.C.Staff and consists of 24 episodes. Maburaho was first aired by WOWOW in Japan on October 14, 2003 with the episode "They Came...". The final episode, titled "It Was Over...", aired on April 6, 2004.

On March 8, 2004, ADV Films announced that it had acquired the license to the animated series. The first DVD volume, also available with an artbox, was released on April 19, 2005 and concluded nearly a year later with volume 7. ADV Films later released a Thinpack of the entire series on April 3, 2007.

The Japanese titles for Episode 18 and 19 ends in the typical Kyoto dialect ending "Dosue", which corresponds to "Desu" in standard Japanese. The characters traveled to Kyoto in those two episodes.

Episode list

References

Maburaho